Xia Chang (1388–1470) originally named Zhu Chang, was a Ming dynasty Chinese painter and government official.

Xia specialized in ink bamboo painting, following the style of Wang Fu. His courtesy name was 'Zhongzhao' and his art names were 'Yufeng' and 'Zizai jushi'.

Life
Xia Chang was born Zhu Chang in September 1388 in Kunshan. He passed the Imperial examinations in 1415, and entered the Hanlin academy. The Yongle Emperor ordered him to write inscriptions for new buildings in Beijing. 
In 1422 Xia Chang was transferred to a position in Beijing, which had recently replaced Nanjing as imperial capital. He became a secretary of the Bureau of Evaluations in the Ministry of personnel. 
In 1448, he became a prefect in Jiangxi province. He was recalled to Beijing and appointed vice minister of the Court of Imperial Sacrifices. He retired in 1457, and died in 1470.

References

 Zhongguo gu dai shu hua jian ding zu. 2000. Zhongguo hui hua quan ji. Zhongguo mei shu fen lei quan ji. Beijing: Wen wu chu ban she. Volume 10.

External links

1388 births
1470 deaths
Ming dynasty painters
Painters from Suzhou
Ming dynasty politicians
Politicians from Suzhou